The 1954 Rugby League World Cup featured the national teams (selected from eighteen-man squads) of four nations.

Statistics
Match details - listing surnames of each team and the point scorers - were included in E.E. Christensen's Official Rugby League Yearbook, as was a summary of the players' point-scoring. This information is reflected in the Rugby League Project website.

Australia

For Australian players, the World Cup tournament took place in 1954's post-season. Their coach was Vic Hey
The team was managed by Spencer O'Neill of Parramatta, NSW and Jack McMahon of Queensland.

The Rugby League News published details of the touring team including each player's age and weight.

Banks, Davies, Flannery, Hall, McCaffery, O'Shea and Watson were selected from Queensland clubs. Pidding was selected from clubs in New South Wales Country areas. This lineup of the squad played for Sydney-based clubs during the 1954 season.

New Zealand
 Manager: Tom McKenzie (West Coast)
 Coach: Jim Amos (Canterbury)
The Rugby League News published details of the Kiwi touring team including each player's provincial team, weight, height, ageand occupation.

Great Britain
For British players, the World Cup tournament took place during the 1954–55 Northern Rugby Football League season. Their coach was Mr Gideon Shaw.
The Rugby League News published the selected British touring team. The following seven players listed in this article did not play a match in the tournament: Billy Boston (Wigan), Willie Horne (Barrow), Geoff Gunney (Hunslet), W. Banks, Ron Rylance (Huddersfield), Alvin Ackerley (Halifax) and Johnny Whiteley (Hull). 
English representative Phil Jackson was born in Canada. David Rose and captain Dave Valentine were representatives from Scotland, and John Thorley from Wales.

France

Coaches: Jean Duhau and René Duffort
The French squad was:

Note: The Rugby League Project has Roger Guilhem playing one match and Gilbert Verdié two, whilst EE Chistensen's Official Rugby League Yearbook has Roger Guilhem playing two matches (the round matches against Great Britain and Australia) and Gilbert Verdié playing one match (the Final against Great Britain).

References

Squads
Rugby League World Cup squads